Anastasia Kuzmina may refer to:

Anastasiya Kuzmina, a Slovak biathlete born in Russia
Anastasia Kuzmina (dancer), a Ukrainian dancer and media personality best known in Italy